Hudar (also Romanized as Hūdar; also known as Basāţ ‘Alī) is a village in Kashkan Rural District, Shahivand District, Dowreh County, Lorestan Province, Iran. At the 2006 census, its population was 201, in 42 families.

References 

Towns and villages in Dowreh County